Germán Cardona Gutiérrez (born 28 December 1956) is a Colombian politician who served as the ninth Minister of Transport of Colombia in the Administration of President Juan Manuel Santos Calderón from 2010 to 2012. A civil engineer and businessman, he was twice elected Mayor of Manizales, once appointed Governor of the Department of Caldas, and served as chairman of the Once Caldas in 2005.

References

External links
 

1956 births
People from Manizales
Living people
National University of Colombia alumni
Colombian civil engineers
Social Party of National Unity politicians
Colombian governors
Mayors of places in Colombia
Ministers of Transport of Colombia